Montes de Oro is a canton in the Puntarenas province of Costa Rica. The head city is in Miramar district.

History 
Montes de Oro was created on 17 July 1915 by decree 42.

Geography 
Montes de Oro has an area of  km² and a mean elevation of  metres.

The mountainous canton lies in the Cordillera de Tilarán northeast of the city of Puntarenas. It is limited on the north by the Aranjuez River. The San Miguel River and Tiacinto River delineate the southern boundary.

Districts 
The canton of Montes de Oro is subdivided into the following districts:
 Miramar
 La Unión
 San Isidro

Demographics 

For the 2011 census, Montes de Oro had a population of  inhabitants.

Transportation

Road transportation 
The canton is covered by the following road routes:

References 

Cantons of Puntarenas Province
Populated places in Puntarenas Province